The Douglas County Courthouse in Lawrence, Kansas is a three-and-a-half-story stone building built in 1903.

It was designed by noted 19th-century architect John G. Haskell in association with another architect, Frederick C. Gunn.

It is a Richardsonian Romanesque work.

Its "dominant feature" is a six-story-tall square clock tower, with four minarets and a pyramidal roof topped by a metal finial.  There is also a smaller octagonal stair tower with an eight-sided roof, topped by another finial.  Windows in the stair tower alternate on the five visible sides of the tower.

References

External links
Douglas County Facilities page

Courthouses on the National Register of Historic Places in Kansas
Romanesque Revival architecture in Kansas
Government buildings completed in 1903
National Register of Historic Places in Douglas County, Kansas
Individually listed contributing properties to historic districts on the National Register in Kansas
County courthouses in Kansas
Lawrence, Kansas